Dapto is a suburb of Wollongong in the Illawarra region of New South Wales, Australia, located on the western side of Lake Illawarra and covering .

History
The name Dapto is said to be an Aboriginal word either from Dabpeto meaning "water plenty", or from tap-toe which described the way a lame Aboriginal elder walked. The suburb was officially founded in 1834, when George Brown transferred the Ship Inn from Wollongong to Mullet Creek Farm, in an area now named in his honour as Brownsville. After an unsuccessful attempt at wheat growing in the 1850s, Dapto embraced the dairy industry. In 1887 the railway opened and a butter factory was established. This began a transformation of Dapto and the town centre shifted south to where the new station was located. The Australian Smelting Company's works were established on Kanahooka Road and employed over 500 men. A railway, operated by the Illawarra Harbour and Land Corporation Limited, connected the smelter with the Government railway at Dapto. By 1903 the Commissioner for Railways declared that Dapto was the most valuable station on the Illawarra line, its traffic being double that of Wollongong. The books John Brown of Brownsville (2012), Gooseberry and Hooka (2012) and Lake Illawarra: an ongoing history (2005) – all written by Joseph Davis and published by the Lake Illawarra Authority – contain much detail about Dapto's history.

Dapto has a number of heritage-listed sites, including Horsley Homestead on Bong Bong Road.

Population
According to the 2016 census of Population, there were 10,730 people in Dapto.
 Aboriginal and Torres Strait Islander people made up 3.7% of the population. 
 79.0% of people were born in Australia. The next most common countries of birth were England 6.1% and Scotland 1.0%.   
 89.2% of people spoke only English at home. 
 The most common responses for religion were Catholic 26.1%, No Religion 26.0% and Anglican 23.9%.

Further information
On Koonawarra Point is Mount Brown Reserve, a hill protected by a nature reserve for its important habitat. The eastern side and summit is owned by Tallawarra Power Station. Dapto used to be home to a smelting industry but this has now closed. Most of the town is residential with several commercial areas. The main one includes Dapto Mall, which is on the Princes Highway. A small area of the escarpment west of Dapto is protected as part of the Illawarra Escapment State Recreation Area, though not accessible to the public. The escarpment west of Dapto includes Mount Bong Bong, the site of an aeroplane crash when the controllers mistook Lake Illawarra for Botany Bay. A plaque commemorates this event in Dapto. Much of the land to the west is still used as farmland, though other ventures such as the shooting grounds exist. The land to the west is noticeably more hilly than the plain to the north of Wollongong.

The South Coast line electric rail service terminated in Dapto prior to electrification being extended to Kiama in 2001. The area of Dapto west of this rail line, formerly pastoral land, has undergone significant expansion over the past 20 years. This area has become the fastest growing part of the greater Wollongong region and consists of a sprawling, medium-density suburbia known as Horsley, now officially a suburb in its own right.

The South Coast Greyhounds, locally known as the 'Dapto Greyhounds', runs races every Thursday evening.

The Dapto Canaries compete in the local Illawarra Rugby League.

Groundz Precinct

The Groundz Precinct, also known as The Groundz or Dapto Showground, is home of the famous Dapto Greyhounds every Thursday night. South Coast Greyhounds (Dapto Greyhound Racing Club) started racing in 1937 on the current site and is set to move to a new site at 34 Bong Bong Road, Dapto in 2025.

Dapto Mall

Dapto Mall is fourth-largest shopping centre in the Illawarra region, after competitors Wollongong Central, Stockland Shellharbour and Warrawong Plaza. Dapto Mall features BIG W, Woolworths and Coles and around 66 stores.

Dapto Ribbonwood Centre
The centre was Dapto's new community centre after relocating in 2001, it is named so after the species of tree that is planted in front. The local library is located on topmost floor of Level 1. It also hosts several conference rooms that can be hired out for a variety of events, ranging from private, small gatherings, to large social events, such as entertainment. The Ribbonwood Centre is also the home of CPSA Dapto Seniors a 'not for profit' community organisation and the largest senior citizen group in the Illawarra, its fortnightly meetings and many weekly activities take place in Heininger House. Heininger House was incorporated in the Ribbonwood Centre when the community centre was constructed in 2001.

Dapto Anglican Church
The Dapto Anglican Church  centre is adjacent to the Dapto Mall and the Dapto Greyhound Racing Club; it has services running from three other sites including the St Aidens building, the hall of Dapto Primary School on a Sunday morning, and the St Lukes Brownsville building (which is historically listed and over 100 years old). There are six services held weekly, as well as children and youth activities on Friday nights, children's programs on a Sunday morning and during the weeks of the school holidays, 'Cafe Church' during the week, and many one-off activities.

Dapto Uniting Church

Dapto Uniting Church is located in the heart of Dapto, next to the Dapto Medical Centre on the Princes Highway. Services are held at 9:30am every Sunday morning and incorporate both contemporary and tradition styles of worship. Children's programs are held during the Sunday service, Sunday's Cool, and mid-week on Wednesdays, Tiddlywinks playgroup. The Dapto Uniting congregation is a healthy community composed of people of all generations, cultures and backgrounds.

The Dapto Uniting Church traces its roots right back to 1841 when Sunday services were first held in a Dapto schoolroom under the leadership of Presbyterian minister Rev. John Tait. With the establishment of the railway network in 1887, the Dapto area experienced a period of continued urban expansion over the ensuing decades. The current red brick building, St Andrews, was officially opened and dedicated on 7 February 1959. Construction work commenced in 1981 to attach new hall facilities to the existing church building.

For many years, the Dapto Uniting family has sought to serve the local community, through ministries such as the Op Shop, regular Market Days, Family Fun Days and group Heart & Soul Exercise sessions.

St. John's Catholic Church
St. John's Church is the public worship centre of Dapto's Catholic population, and can be found in Jeramatta Street. Mass times are: Saturday Vigil Mass – 5:00pm, and Sundays at 7:30, 9:30 and 6:00pm. Cups of tea may be had after every mass. It also has a new Youth Group.

Dapto Public School
The original Dapto Public School opened in August 1875, and was operated out of a local church hall. A permanent and more central location was opened on the corner of Byamee and Moombara Streets in 1928, which remained the schools' location until 2004. It was not accessible during the last few years. Due to large expansion of the Horsley area, the school relocated to Sierra Drive, Horsley, opening in 2004.

Dapto in Popular Culture
Dapto was mentioned in The Aunty Jack Show, as a parody of the lyrics of the Lucky Starr song "I've Been Everywhere" were changed so that, instead of listing a wide range of Australian towns, the song said "I've been to Wollongong, Wollongong, Wollongong, Wollongong,... Wollongong, Wollongong, Dapto, Wollongong".

A "bizarro" alternative universe Dapto is the main setting for the adult animated television series Koala Man  that premiered on Hulu in the US and Disney+ in Australia on 9 January 2023. The series takes place in an alternate universe where the wreck of the Titanic never happened, indirectly resulting in the United States of America being destroyed (except Hollywood becoming an island), Australia becoming the world’s superpower, and Nicole Kidman becoming its Queen.

See also
 Dapto High School
 Dapto Railway Station

References

External links

Wollongong City Library – Dapto Local Statistics
Dapto Mall Website
Wollongong City Library – Dapto History
Dapto Anglican Church
Dapto Uniting Church
Dapto Community Church (Seventh-day Adventist)
Satellite photos from Google Maps
Dapto History
Dapto Greyhounds
CPSA Dapto Seniors – Senior Citizens Community Organisation

Suburbs of Wollongong
City of Wollongong